Vistarino is a comune (municipality) in the Province of Pavia in the Italian region Lombardy, located about 30 km southeast of Milan and about 13 km east of Pavia.

Vistarino borders the following municipalities: Albuzzano, Copiano, Cura Carpignano, Filighera, Magherno, Marzano, Roncaro, Torre d'Arese.

References

Cities and towns in Lombardy